Ishlaq (also Romanized as Īshlaq; also known as Ashlogh, Eshlaq, and Eshleq) is a village in Tirchai Rural District, Kandovan District, Meyaneh County, East Azerbaijan Province, Iran. At the 2006 census, its population was 461, in 171 families.

References 

Populated places in Meyaneh County